The Twin Otter was and is used by dozens of airlines and militaries around the world, and was produced in three main series (100, 200, 300) until 1988.

As of 2006, over 40 years after design and manufacturing work on the original DHC-6 began, more than 500 of this aircraft were still flying. In that year Viking Air purchased the type certificate for the DHC-6 and announced its intention to offer a new build Series 400 Twin Otter.

Current civil operators 
In 2016, there were 281 Twin Otters in airline service with 26 new aircraft on order: 112 in North/South America, 106 in Asia Pacific & Middle East (16 orders), 38 in Europe (10 orders) and 25 in Africa.

A total of 270 Twin Otters were in airline service in 2018, and 14 on order: 111 in North/South America, 117 in the Asia-Pacific and Middle East (14 orders), 26 in Europe and 13 in Africa.

In 2020, there were a total of 315 Twin Otters worldwide with 220 in service, 95 in storage and 8 on order. By region there were 22 in Africa, 142 in Asia Pacific (8 orders), 37 in Europe, 4 in the Middle East and 110 in the Americas.

As of February 2023, there were 108 Twin Otters registered in Canada.

Historical civil operators 

♠ original operators

Former operators are listed where possible.

 Leeward Islands Air Transport (LIAT) ♠ - former operator

Aeropelican
Trans Australia Airlines

AirWest Airlines (Canada)
Athabaska Airlines ♠
Austin Airways
 Bradley Air Services - (now First Air)

Calm Air International
Georgian Bay Airlines ♠
Kenn Borek Air
Labrador Airways
 Midwest Airlines ♠
Ministry of Natural Resources (Ontario) ♠ - forest firefighting

NorOntair
Northwood Airlines ♠
Pacific Western Airlines (PWA) - former operator
Ptarmigan Airways - former operator (merged into First Air)
Sabourin Lake Airways
Sander Geophysics
Transport Canada - former operator, 15 aircraft
Time Air
Wardair Canada ♠ - former operator

TACV Cabo Verde Airlines

ACES Colombia

 Lina Congo

Air Djibouti

Air Alpes ♠
Air Calédonie
Air Caraïbes - a DHC-6-300 crashed in March 2001 near Saint Barthélemy airport
Air Guadeloupe
 Air Polynesie (now Air Tahiti)

Delta Air
DLT 
 HADAG Air

Guyana Airways

Merpati Nusantara Airlines ♠

SkyKef
Ayit Aviation and Tourism

Aeralpi

Lao Air

Air Madagascar

Maldivian

Air Mali

 Aeronaves de Mexico♠ and successor Aeromexico
 Transportes Aereos Terrestes♠

Widerøe♠ - former operator

Pakistan International Airlines - former operator

Spantax ♠

 Air Commuter ♠ - former operator
 Air New England
 Air North
 Alaska Aeronautical Industries (AAI)
 Air Wisconsin ♠ - former operator
 Crown Airways
 Frontier Airlines
 Golden West Airlines
 Hawaii Jet-Air ♠ - former operator
 Northern Consolidated Airlines (NCA) ♠ - former operator (acquired by Wien Air Alaska which in turn continued to operate these DHC-6 aircraft).
 Pilgrim Airlines ♠ - former operator (acquired by Business Express)
 Rocky Mountain Airways
 Trans East International ♠ - former operator

Military and government operators 
Including police users.

 
 Argentine Air Force (Marambio Base) / LADE
 Argentine Army
 Argentine Navy

 Benin Air Force 1 

 
 Royal Canadian Air Force (formerly Canadian Forces) - 4 CC-138s (DHC-6-300s) - Operated by 440 Transport Squadron in Yellowknife, NT

 
 11 Chilean Air Force

 
 1? Colombian National Police

 
 2 Ecuadorian Air Force (TAME)

 
 2 Ethiopian Air Force loaned from Army

 
 5 French Air and Space Force

 
 1 Haitian Air Force

 
 ? (retired) Jamaica Defence Force

 
 ? (retired) Nepalese Army Air Service
 Nepalese Royal Flight

 
 Royal Norwegian Air Force (Retired from active service)

 
Panamanian Public Forces 1 (Army until 1988)
National Air and Naval Service of Panama

 
 Paraguayan Air Force (retired)

 
 Peruvian Air Force (12 series -400 recently purchased)

 
 Sudanese Air Force - one photo survey aircraft operated by Sudan Airways for the air force.

 
 Uganda Police Force Air Wing 

 
 1 United States Air Force
 1 United States Army
 1 NASA

 
 6 Vietnamese People's Navy

References

Notes

Bibliography 

 

Operators
DHC-6